Cismadinone acetate, also known as 6α-chloro-δ1-dehydro-17α-acetoxyprogesterone or as 6α-chloro-17α-acetoxypregna-1,4-diene-3,20-dione, is a steroidal progestin related to the 17α-hydroxyprogesterone derivatives which was never marketed. It is the acetylated form of cismadinone, which is also a progestin but, similarly to cismadinone acetate, was never marketed.

See also
 List of progestogens
 List of progestogen esters

References

Abandoned drugs
Acetate esters
Organochlorides
Pregnanes
Progestogen esters
Progestogens